Matt Vant Leven (born 23 October 1987) is a New Zealand rugby union footballer who plays as a loose forward for Waikato in the ITM Cup.

His impressive ITM Cup performances have seen him named in the team's Wider Training Squad for the 2013 Super Rugby season.

Matt Vant Leven will play for Kobelco Steelers in the 2014-'15 season of the Japanese top tier championship, Top League.

References

External links
Matt Vant Leven itsrugby.co.uk Player Statistics

Living people
1987 births
New Zealand rugby union players
Chiefs (rugby union) players
Waikato rugby union players
Rugby union number eights
Rugby union players from Rotorua
People educated at Rotorua Boys' High School
New Zealand expatriate rugby union players
New Zealand expatriate sportspeople in Japan
Expatriate rugby union players in Japan
Kobelco Kobe Steelers players